Nikolaus Rüdinger (25 March 1832 – 25 August 1896) was a German anatomist born in Bingen am Rhein, in the Grand Duchy of Hesse (present-day Rhineland-Palatinate).

He studied at the Universities of Heidelberg and Giessen. In 1855 he worked as a prosector at the University of Munich, where in 1870 was appointed professor of anatomy and second curator of the anatomical institute.

Rüdinger is credited for introducing a new method for preservation of corpses in the dissecting room. This procedure involved injections of carbolic acid mixed with glycerine and alcohol. In addition, he is remembered for using photography for anatomical diagnoses. He died in Tutzing on 25 August 1896 at the age of 64.

Selected publications 
 "Anatomie des peripherischen Nervensystems des menschlichen Körpers" (Anatomy of the peripheral nervous system of human corpses), two volumes- 1870
 "Atlas des peripherischen Nervensystems" (Atlas of the peripheral nervous system), 1872
 "Atlas des menschlichen Gehörorgans" (Atlas of the human hearing organs), 1867–70
 "Topographisch-chirurgische Anatomie des Menschen" (Topographical-surgical anatomy of humans), 1870–78
 "Beitrag zur Morpholegte des Gaumsegels und des Verdauungsapparats", (Contributions to the morphology of the soft palate and the digestive apparatus), 1879
 "Beitrag zur Anatomie der Affenspalte und der Interparietalfurche", 1882
 "Beitrag zur Anatomie des Sprachzentrums" (Contributions to the anatomy of the language center), 1882
 "Zur Anatomie der Prostata" (The Anatomy of the prostate), 1883

References 
 Parts of this article are based on a translation of an article from the German Wikipedia.
 Maryland Medical Journal, Article on Preservation of Corpses

1832 births
1896 deaths
People from Bingen am Rhein
People from Rhenish Hesse
German anatomists
Academic staff of the Ludwig Maximilian University of Munich
Heidelberg University alumni
University of Giessen alumni